Happy Together may refer to:

Music 
 "Happy Together" (song), a 1967 song by the Turtles that has been covered several times
 Happy Together (The Turtles album) (1967)
 Happy Together concert tours in 1985 and in 2010–2015 featuring The Turtles, Gary Lewis, The Buckinghams, and others
 Happy Together (Twins album) (2002)
 Happy Together (Leningrad Cowboys album) (1994)
 Happy Together (The Nylons album) (1987)
 Happy Together, a 2017 album by Mega Bog
 "Happy Together", a 2009 song by Super Junior from Sorry, Sorry

Film 
 Happy Together (1989 American film), starring Helen Slater and Patrick Dempsey
 Happy Together (1989 Hong Kong film), by Stephen Shin
 Happy Together (1997 film), a Hong Kong film by Wong Kar-wai
 Happy Together (2008 film), by Geoffrey Enthoven
 Happy Together (2018 film), a South Korean film by Kim Jung-hwan

Television 
 Happy Together (South Korean TV series), a 1999 South Korean drama by SBS
 Happy Together (talk show), a 2001 South Korean talk show by KBS
 Happy Together (Russian TV series), a 2006 Russian remake of Married... with Children
 Happy Together (American TV series), a 2018 American comedy series
 Happy Together (Philippine TV series), a 2021 comedy series in the Philippines by GMA Network
 Inday Will Always Love You, a 2018 drama series in the Philippines known internationally as Happy Together

Books 
 Happy Together: Bridging the Australia China Divide, an upcoming autobiography by David Walker and Li Yao

See also 
 So Happy Together (disambiguation)